Xun Can ( 209–237), courtesy name Fengqian, was a Chinese xuanxue philosopher of the state of Cao Wei in the Three Kingdoms period of China. He was a son of Xun Yu.

Family background
Xun Can's ancestral home was in Yingchuan Commandery (穎川郡; around present-day Xuchang, Henan). He was born in the influential Xun family as a son of Xun Yu, a prominent statesman of the late Eastern Han dynasty and an adviser to the warlord Cao Cao. His exact birth order among his siblings is not clear; it is only known that he was younger than Xun Yu's sixth son, Xun Yi.

Views on human understanding of reality
Xun Can was markedly different from the rest of his brothers; he enjoyed studying and discussing Taoism as opposed to his brothers' preference for Confucianism. He believed that when Zigong talked about how sages came to understand human nature and divine order, he was referring to a particular higher state of mind that these sages had attained, and that state of mind cannot be expressed in any way. In his opinion, even though the past sages had written books such as the six Confucian classics, these books are actually the "leftovers" from the sages' journeys towards that higher state of mind rather than an expression of that state of mind itself. Xun Yu, one of Xun Can's elder brothers, rebutted him, "The Yi Zhuan (易傳) says the sages created images to make sense of reality. They used words to express and describe their understanding of reality. How can you say that human understanding cannot be expressed in any way?"

Xun Can replied,

Even the most skilled debaters at the time were unable to counter his argument.

Views on Xun Yu and Xun You
Xun Can had another debate with his brothers about their father Xun Yu and their third cousin Xun You. In his opinion, his father focused on maintaining his image as a morally virtuous and upright man who assumed the moral high ground, whereas his third cousin was not concerned about his external image and was careful about maintaining a low profile and keeping to himself. His brothers were angry with him for describing Xun You in more favourable terms, but they could not refute him.

Friendships with Fu Gu and Xiahou Xuan
In the early Taihe era (227–233) of Cao Rui's reign, Xun Can travelled to the imperial capital Luoyang to meet Fu Gu and have a discussion with him. Fu Gu focused on concrete details while Xun Can focused on abstract things, hence they could not understand each other and ended up in a heated quarrel. Pei Hui, the Inspector of Ji Province, stepped in to mediate and successfully helped them resolve their misunderstandings. Xun Can and Fu Gu developed a close friendship after that.

Xun Can was also close friends with Xiahou Xuan. He once told Fu Gu and Xiahou Xuan, "The two of you will become more famous than me, but not as wise as me." Fu Gu retorted, "A famous person should also be a wise person. How can there be people who gain more than they are worth?" Xun Can replied, "A person becomes famous as a reward for being ambitious. However, ambition is a quality on its own and isn't necessarily linked to wisdom. I can also become famous like you, but I might not do so in the same way as you."

Marriage and death
Xun Can assessed women in terms of their beauty and appearance rather than their talent and intelligence. He married the general Cao Hong's daughter, who was known for her pretty looks. At their wedding, they were dressed in extravagant garments and had expensive decorations for their bedroom. Xun Can treated his wife with special care and devotion. However, their romance did not last long as she died of illness a few years later. Fu Gu went to comfort Xun Can at his wife's funeral and saw that he was extremely grieved even though he did not shed tears. Fu Gu told him, "It's difficult to find a wife who has both looks and talents. However, you prefer looks over talents, so it's not too hard to find a new wife. What's there to feel sad about?" Xun Can replied, "It's difficult to find another beautiful woman like her again! Even though she may not have had the most beautiful looks, it wasn't easy for me to have found someone like her." He was so deeply upset over his wife's death that he died a few years later at the age of 28.

Xun Can's personality and outlook on life made it difficult for him to socialise with ordinary people. His friends were all great talents of their time. Although only about 10 people attended his funeral, all of them were famous members of the scholar-gentry. They mourned him so much at his funeral that they even touched the hearts of passers by.

Yuan Can's name change
The Liu Song dynasty official Yuan Can admired Xun Can so much that he changed his given name from "Minsun" to "Can". He also adopted the courtesy name "Jingqian", which was also the courtesy name of Xun Can's brother Xun Yi.

See also
 Lists of people of the Three Kingdoms

References

 
 
 Li, Yanshou (7th century). History of the Southern Dynasties (Nan Shi).
 Pei, Songzhi (5th century). Annotations to Records of the Three Kingdoms (Sanguozhi zhu).
 

3rd-century births
3rd-century deaths
People of Cao Wei
Philosophers from Henan
Three Kingdoms philosophers